The Chineja is a right tributary of the river Prut in Romania. It flows through the towns and villages Berești, Târgu Bujor, Foltești, Tămăoani, Frumușița, Tulucești and Vânători, and through the Lake Brateș.

Tributaries

The following rivers are tributaries to the river Chineja (from source to mouth):

Left: Slivna, Mieloea, Radiciu, Roșcani
Right: Băneasa, Bujorul, Covurlui, Frumușița, Ijdileni

References

Rivers of Romania
Rivers of Galați County
Tributaries of the Prut